Thomas Winther Carr (born April 6, 1942) is a former American football defensive tackle. He played for the New Orleans Saints in 1968.

References

1942 births
Living people
People from Ventura, California
Sportspeople from Ventura County, California
Players of American football from California
American football defensive tackles
Morgan State Bears football players
New Orleans Saints players